Middle Men is a 2009 American drama film directed by George Gallo and written by Gallo and Andy Weiss. It stars Luke Wilson, Giovanni Ribisi, Gabriel Macht and James Caan. The movie is based on the experiences of Christopher Mallick, who was previously associated with the Internet billing companies Epoch and ePassporte. Christopher Mallick has been accused of stealing millions of dollars from his customers at ePassporte to fund the creation of the film.

Plot
In 2004 Houston, Jack Harris leaves home with several million dollars in a duffel bag, to pay Russian mobsters. Harris is worried about the safety of his wife Diana and their children.

Flashback to 1997 in Los Angeles, where Jack helps a sick friend managing a nightclub. Nearby, Wayne Beering and Buck Dolby are best friends renting together. The drug-addicted friends are watching porn movie reels when Wayne asks why there is no porn on the internet. Buck, a former NASA scientist, takes 15 minutes to create a program to allow online credit card transactions to charge people for looking at dirty pictures on their website. They quickly earn thousands of dollars.  Needing more porn content they approach Nikita Sokoloff, a Russian mob boss who owns a local strip club; Sokoloff agrees to 25% of their business in return for letting them photograph and film his strippers.

Within a month Buck and Wayne's website is hugely successful.  They party in Las Vegas while neglecting payments to Sokoloff.  Jack has made the LA nightclub a success and attracts the attention of Jerry Haggerty, a crooked lawyer hired by Wayne and Buck to sort out their problem with Sokoloff.  Jack meets the friends and becomes a partner in the business, paying Haggerty $200,000 to get out, knowing Haggerty is under federal indictment and thus a threat to the business.

Sokoloff's nephew comes to collect his $400,000 profit, but when he threatens to kill Jack's family, one of Jack's body guards punches him so hard that he falls dead. Jack and his partners dump the body in the ocean and fabricate a story that Sokoloff's nephew took the money and ran.  Sokoloff is skeptical, but agrees to let it pass in return for an increase to 50% of the partnership.

Jack expands the business by dropping their porn site and focusing on the online credit card billing services. They create a billing company called "24/7 billing.com", becoming the titular Middle Men for other internet-based porn providers.  The billing business is making hundreds of millions of dollars within a year. Jack becomes addicted to the money, sex and power of his new L.A. lifestyle, spends little time with his Houston family and starts a relationship with porn star Audrey Dawns.

Haggerty, bitter that Jack cut him out of a multimillion dollar partnership, schemes to take over the company. He easily manipulates the foolish Wayne and Buck to work with Denny Z,  providing billing services for Denny's numerous child pornography websites.

Audrey's live stream porn site is watched by an international web of terrorists, which the US Government uses to track and arrest or kill the terrorists. The FBI asks for Jack and Audrey's help to expand their terrorist hunt, but Wayne and Buck fear that Jack is meeting with the FBI to turn them in for the murder of Sokoloff's nephew and the child porn. The two confide in Haggerty about killing Sokoloff's nephew, which Haggerty uses to incite Sokoloff to make a move on Jack.

When Jack finds out that his partners are helping facilitate Denny Z's child porn, he confronts Denny Z at a house party.  Jack sees Audrey having sex with two men, and realizes how much he misses his family, leading him to break up with Audrey.

An FBI agent warns Jack that 24/7billing.com is about to be indicted for supporting child porn. Jack's life is further complicated when Sokoloff's men kidnap his maid's son, who they believe is Jack's son. Jack gathers up several million dollars and goes to meet Sokoloff, as seen at the start of the film.

Jack is told that the boy will be released if he signs a contract giving his partnership share to Wayne, Buck, Sokoloff, and Haggerty. Jack signs the agreement but backdates it to before Denny Z's child porn business was added.  Sokoloff shoots Haggerty dead but lets Jack go as thanks for all the money he has made him.

Jack's FBI friend charges Sokoloff, Wayne and Buck with providing billing services for child porn. Jack and the maid's son return home, where Diane welcomes Jack back into their family.

Cast

Release
Middle Men was released on August 6, 2010.

The first official theatrical trailer for the film was released on June 16, 2010.

A red band trailer was released on July 10, 2010.

A long take sequence taking place at an orgy was cut from the film.  The scene's inclusion would have pushed the film from an R rating to an NC17 rating. The scene was subsequently leaked to adult video clip website Pornhub. It was subsequently included on the home-video release.

Reception

The film received mixed reviews.
Rotten Tomatoes gives the film a score of 40% based on 53 reviews, with an average score of 5.54/10. The sites consensus states "Middle Men benefits from a solid cast, particularly Luke Wilson, but its muddled script lets them down".
Metacritic gives the film a weighted average score of 60% based on reviews from 20 critics.

The film grossed only $754,301 at the box office during its three-week run. The budget was $20 million.

Home media
Middle Men was released on Blu-ray and DVD on February 8, 2011.

Music

Two soundtrack albums were released, both on August 3, 2010: Middle Men: Original Motion Picture Score, composed by Brian Tyler, and Middle Men: Original Motion Picture Soundtrack, collecting songs used in the film.
Score

Soundtrack

References

External links

 
 
 
 
 
 

2009 films
2009 drama films
Films scored by Brian Tyler
Films about pornography
Films directed by George Gallo
Films set in 1997
Films set in 2004
Films set in Houston
Films set in Los Angeles
Films shot in California
Film producers from Texas
2000s English-language films
American drama films
American films based on actual events
2000s American films
English-language drama films